Sticks and Stones is an ITV television drama series that was first broadcast on 16 December 2019. Created and written by Mike Bartlett, based on his play Bull, the series is about sales associate Thomas Benson, who starts having paranoia about his co-workers following a bad presentation.

Cast
Ken Nwosu as Thomas Benson
Susannah Fielding as Isobel
Ben Miller as Carter
Sean Sagar as Andy
Ritu Arya as Becky
Debbie Chazen as Natalie
Alexandra Roach as Jess
Daisy Boo Brandford as Millie
Jordan Baker as Lisa

Episode list

Reception
Rotten Tomatoes reports an approval rating of 40% based on 10 reviews, with an average rating of 5.10/10. The site's critics' consensus reads: "Sticks and Stones may not break any bones, but its mundane melodrama may hurt your viewing experience." The Independent gave the first episode two out of five stars, dubbing it "shrieking melodrama". The Telegraph gave it three stars.

References

External links
 

2019 British television series debuts
2019 British television series endings
2010s British drama television series
2010s British television miniseries
ITV television dramas
British thriller television series
English-language television shows
Television shows set in England